The 2020 United States presidential election in Alaska took place on Tuesday, November 3, 2020, as part of the 2020 United States presidential election in which all 50 states and the District of Columbia participated. Alaska voters chose three electors to represent them in the Electoral College via a popular vote pitting incumbent Republican President Donald Trump and his running mate, incumbent Vice President Mike Pence, against Democratic challenger and former Vice President Joe Biden and his running mate, United States Senator Kamala Harris of California. The Libertarian, Green, Constitution, and Alliance Party nominees were also on the ballot, as was an Independent candidate. Write-in candidates were required to file a declaration of intent with the Alaska Division of Elections at least five days before the election, and their results were not individually counted.

Prior to the election, 13 of 14 news organizations making predictions considered this a state Trump would win, or otherwise a red state. Since it was admitted into the Union in 1959, Alaska has voted for the Republican nominee in every single election except 1964 in Lyndon B. Johnson's nationwide landslide, when he carried it with 65.91% of the vote. However, polling and voting trends indicated a possibly competitive race; on the day of the election, FiveThirtyEight had Trump leading by an average of 7.7%, and 270toWin had him up by 5.6%. 58% of voters are registered as unaffiliated, undeclared, or Independent, the highest proportion of any state. The Senate and House of Representatives races down the ballot were also surprisingly competitive.

Despite not necessarily being a swing state, Alaska was also one of the last states to be called; the state did not start counting absentee ballots or early votes that were cast after October 29 until November 10. Mail-in votes only had to be received by November 13 for them to be counted, and counting had to be completed by November 18. As a result, Alaska was called for Trump on November 11. He won the state by 10.06%, the closest margin in the state since 1992, when Republican George H. W. Bush beat Democrat Bill Clinton by a 9.17-point plurality in a three-way race with an unusually strong showing from an independent candidate, Ross Perot. Biden received the highest percentage of the vote for a Democrat in the state since 1964. It was also the second time a Democrat won over 40% of the vote in the state since 1968, the first being Barack Obama in 2012.

Biden narrowly won Anchorage, the state's largest city, making him the first Democrat to do so since Johnson, which was in part attributable to Biden's outperformance in comparison to local Democrats and nationwide urban backlash against Trump more so than down-ballot Republicans. This also made Trump the first candidate of either party to prevail in Alaska without winning Anchorage. Biden also held traditionally Democratic strongholds in the state in the Bush; the Far North, consisting of the North Slope Borough, is the home of the Inupiat while the Southwest is dominated by Native American Yup'ik, Alutiiq, and Aleut communities. In 2019, Native Americans made up an estimated 15.6% of the state's population. The Southeast, which encompasses Juneau and Sitka, was also carried by Biden. However, his victories in traditionally Democratic regions and in closely divided Anchorage were offset largely by Trump's landslide wins in the Kenai Peninsula and the Matanuska-Susitna Borough, where he carried upwards of 70% of the vote in some regions. Trump also dominated the Interior and the city of Fairbanks, enough to award the state's three electoral votes to Trump. Alaska ultimately weighed in as 14.51 percentage points more Republican than the national average in 2020.

Alaska shifted 4.67% to the Democratic nominee compared to the 2016 election.

Primary elections

Canceled Republican primary

On September 21, 2019, the Alaska Republican Party became one of several state Republican parties to officially cancel their respective primaries and caucuses. Donald Trump's re-election campaign and GOP officials have cited the fact that Republicans canceled several state primaries when George H. W. Bush and George W. Bush sought a second term in 1992 and 2004, respectively; and Democrats scrapped some of their primaries when Bill Clinton and Barack Obama were seeking reelection in 1996 and 2012, respectively. Per The Green Papers, the party also argued that "When an incumbent Republican President is seeking the Republican nomination for President, a PPP [presidential preference poll] need not be conducted" and that "the incumbent Republican President will be the only "Qualified Presidential Candidate" in this case."

Of the 29 total delegates, 3 is allocated to the at-large congressional district, 10 to at-large delegates, and another 3 are allocated to pledged party leaders and elected officials (PLEO delegates). 13 bonus delegates were allocated.

The state party still formally conducted the higher meetings in their walking subcaucus-type delegate selection system. The legislative district conventions were held on the four consecutive Saturdays from February 8 to 29 to select delegates to the Alaska State Republican Convention. At the Alaska State Republican Convention, which took place from April 2 to April 4, 2020, the state party formally bound all 29 of its national pledged delegates to Trump.

The 26 pledged delegates Alaska sent to the national convention were joined by 3 pledged PLEO delegates, consisting of the National Committeeman, National Committeewoman, and chairman of the Alaska Republican Party.

Democratic primary

The Alaska Democratic primary was originally scheduled for April 4, 2020. On March 23, due to concerns over the COVID-19 pandemic, the Alaska Democratic Party canceled in-person voting, but extended mail-in voting to April 10.

Libertarian nominee 
No contest was held for the Libertarian Party's nomination in the state of Alaska. At the 2020 Libertarian National Convention, the Alaskan delegates cast their votes for Georgia politician John Monds, but on the third and fourth ballots voted for Jo Jorgensen, psychology senior lecturer at Clemson University. Jorgensen would become the party's nominee after being elected on the fourth ballot, her running mate being entrepreneur and podcaster Spike Cohen.

General election

Final predictions

Polling
Graphical summary

Aggregate polls

Polls

Donald Trump vs. Pete Buttigieg

Donald Trump vs. Kamala Harris

Donald Trump vs. Bernie Sanders

Donald Trump vs. Elizabeth Warren

Fundraising 
According to the Federal Election Commission, in 2019 and 2020, of the candidates who were on the ballot, Donald Trump and his interest groups raised $1,487,277.13, Joe Biden raised $1,321,242.60, and Jo Jorgensen raised $7,420.85 from Alaska-based contributors. Don Blankenship, Brock Pierce, and Rocky De La Fuente, all of which were on the ballot, did not raise any money from the state.

Candidate ballot access 

 Donald Trump / Mike Pence, Republican
 Joe Biden / Kamala Harris, Democratic
 Jo Jorgensen / Spike Cohen, Libertarian
 Jesse Ventura / Cynthia McKinney, Green
 Don Blankenship / William Mohr, Constitution
 Brock Pierce / Karla Ballard, Independent
 Rocky De La Fuente / Darcy Richardson, Alliance

In addition, write-in candidates were required to file a Declaration of Intent with the Alaska Division of Elections at least five days before the election. They were also obligated to file a financial disclosure statement. Write-in votes were not counted individually. The following candidates were given write-in access:

 Dennis Andrew Ball / Richard A. Sanders, American Party of America – American National Committee
 Barbara Ruth Bellar / Kendra Bryant, Republican
 President R19 Boddie / Eric C. Stoneham, Independent
 David C. Byrne / Tony N. Reed, C.C.U.S.A.
 Brian T. Carroll / Amar Patel, American Solidarity
 Todd Cella / Timothy Bryan "Tim" Cella, Independent
 Mark Robert Charles / Adrian D. Wallace, Independent
 Ryan Stephen Ehrenreich / Veronica Ehrenreich, Independent
 Howard "Howie" Gresham Hawkins / Angela Nicola Walker, Socialist Party USA
 Thomas "Tom" Hoefling / Andy Prior, Independent
 Shawn W. Howard / Alyssa C. Howard, Independent
 Dario David Hunter / Dawn Neptune Adams, Progressive
 Joseph W. "Joe" McHugh / Elizabeth "Liz" Storm, Independent
 Albert L. Raley / Darlene Raley, Republican
 Deborah Ann "Debbie" Rouse / Sheila Maria Cannon, Independent
 Jade Simmons / Claudeliah J. "CJ" Roze, Independent
 Mary Ruth Caro Simmons / Sherrie Dow, Independent
 Ajay Sood / Richard Mende, Independent
 Sheila "Samm" Tittle / John Wagner, Independent
 Kasey J. Wells / Rachel M. Wells, Independent
 Kanye West / Michelle Tidball, Independent
 Demetra Jefferson Wysinger / Cedric D. Jefferson, WXYZ New Day

Electoral slates 
Technically the voters of Alaska cast their ballots for electors, or representatives to the Electoral College, rather than directly for the President and Vice President. Alaska is allocated 3 electors because it has 1 congressional district and 2 senators. All candidates who appear on the ballot or qualify to receive write-in votes must submit a list of 3 electors who pledge to vote for their candidate and their running mate. Whoever wins the most votes in the state is awarded all 3 electoral votes. Their chosen electors then vote for president and vice president. Although electors are pledged to their candidate and running mate, they are not obligated to vote for them. An elector who votes for someone other than their candidate is known as a faithless elector. In the state of Alaska, a faithless elector's vote is counted and not penalized.

The electors of each state and the District of Columbia met on December 14, 2020, to cast their votes for president and vice president. All 3 pledged electors cast their votes for President Donald Trump and Vice President Mike Pence. The Electoral College itself never meets as one body. Instead, the electors from each state and the District of Columbia meet in their respective state capitals (the District of Columbia electors meet within the District). The electoral vote was tabulated and certified by Congress in a joint session on January 6, 2021, per the Electoral Count Act.

These electors were nominated by each party in order to vote in the Electoral College should their candidate win the state:

Delay in results 
As expected, there was a nationwide delay in reporting election results, due to the extreme influx of absentee and mail-in ballots as a public health measure in response to the COVID-19 pandemic, which infected at least 17,448 Alaskans and killed 84 by Election Day. Each state imposed its own election procedures, such as expanding absentee voting and increased sanitization of polling station supplies, causing varying delays depending on the state. In Alaska, these delays were especially severe, though they did not receive much attention due to the state's comparatively minor and uncompetitive electoral presence as opposed to many other slower-counting states. Alaska mailed absentee ballot applications to every voter aged 65 and over. Mail-in ballots only needed to be postmarked by Election Day and received by November 13 (November 18 for overseas voters), further delaying the count. Only early votes cast before October 29 and Election Day votes would be released on Election Night and the state could not even begin the counting of absentee ballots nor the remaining early votes until November 10. Counting was expected to be complete by November 18. By November 4, the state still had at least 122,233 absentee ballots to count. Alaska and New York are the only two states to begin counting absentee ballots after Election Day. Gail Felunumiai, Alaska's Director of Elections, attributed the delay to the need to verify that voters who voted by mail and also at their polling places did not have their ballots counted twice. 

Prior to the counting of absentee ballots, Trump led with 61.79% of the vote, resembling a "red mirage" effect seen in the rest of the country where Republicans initially overperformed due to the delayed counting of absentee and early votes, which leaned heavily Democratic – in Alaska specifically, Joe Biden won 54.78% of absentee ballots to Trump's 42.06%, narrowing up the margin as more votes were counted. The delay in counting and the consequential red mirage effect also left many state legislative races undecided for weeks, with seven incumbent Democratic state legislators trailing in their re-election bids before the counting of absentee votes. The extreme rural nature of the state only worsened the delay: with many local communities being accessible only by boat or plane, seven communities had to vote entirely by absentee ballots in the primary due to a last-minute shortage of election workers. The Associated Press called the race for Trump on November 11 at 12:16 PM EST (8:16 AM AKST), 4 days after President-elect Biden won the national election.

Results

By State House district 
Unlike every other U.S. state, Alaska is not divided into counties or parishes. Rather, it is administratively divided into 20 boroughs: 19 organized and 1 unorganized, which act as county-equivalents. The Unorganized Borough lacks a borough government structure and itself is divided into eleven census areas. Contrary to election results in most states, official results by borough are not available – rather, they are estimates based on precinct-level data. However, the Alaska Division of Elections does release official results by State House district, which are listed in the table below. Trump won 21 districts to Biden's 19. Biden also won overseas ballots. The 5th, 23rd, 25th, 27th, 28th, and 35th districts swung from voting for Donald Trump in 2016 to Joe Biden in 2020.

Boroughs and census areas that flipped from  Republican to Democratic 
Prince of Wales–Hyder Census Area (largest city: Craig)
Anchorage

Borough that flipped from Democratic to Republican 
North Slope Borough (largest city: Utqiagvik)

Results by congressional district
Trump won the state's lone at-large district.

Analysis 
Scott Goldsmith, an economist at the University of Alaska Anchorage, identifies the Alaskan economy as a three-legged stool, with the legs being the petroleum and gas industry; the federal government and military; and other services. The Alaskan electorate is generally aligned with the Republican Party due to the Democrats' opposition to the oil industry, which is the forefront of the state's economy. The state ranks sixth in the nation for crude oil production, producing 174.8 million barrels in 2018, with the largest oil field in North America by land area in Prudhoe Bay. 110,000 jobs (roughly 31%) are in the petroleum and gas industry. The Democratic Party's 2020 platform supported net-zero emissions by 2050, including an end to carbon pollution by the power industry by 2035, both of which would entail ultimately ending oil production entirely. Meanwhile, Trump supported expansion of the country's gas and oil industries and rolled back several environmental protections enacted by the Barack Obama administration. Several of Trump's environmental policies involved loosening restrictions on energy, hunting, and mining in the state: he instructed the Department of Agriculture to exempt Tongass National Forest from logging restrictions; supported the construction of Pebble Mine, an unpopular gold and copper mine in Bristol Bay (though the permit was ultimately denied); rolled back limits on hunters in federal land in Alaska; and opened the Arctic National Wildlife Refuge to drilling. While these policies expanded their respective industries, they were met with opposition among environmental groups and the Gwich'in, whose sacred land is partly within the refuge. Biden pledged to reverse several of Trump's climate policies and address the climate crisis, and he enacted a temporary moratorium on gas and oil leasing in the ANWR after being inaugurated on January 20, 2021.

Alaska also aligns with the Republicans due to issues regarding the Second Amendment, most prominently for hunting as 64.5% of Alaskan adults own a gun, the third highest proportion in the country. Biden supported several gun control measures in his 2020 platform while Trump and the Republican Party ideologically opposes gun control with the exception of red flag laws. Trump's environmental and gun policy included reviving hunting techniques in Alaska, an action condemned by several animal rights groups, including the Humane Society Legislative Fund, which endorsed the Biden/Harris ticket on October 6, 2020.

Also playing a major role in Alaska's economy is the federal government, which was responsible for 135,000 jobs between 2004 and 2006, the most of any industry, part of which is attributable to the government's large military presence in the state. Nationwide exit polling collected by Edison Research showed Trump winning veterans 54–44, a major decline from 2016 when he won them 60–34 against Hillary Clinton, possibly explaining Alaska's swing towards the Democratic Party. The other 122,000 jobs in Alaska are mostly in the seafood, tourism, mining, timber, and international air cargo industries. The seafood industry faced extreme disruptions from the COVID-19 pandemic, with 98% of fishermen surveyed saying their businesses have been negatively affected by the pandemic and 70% stating they stopped fishing altogether. The tourism industry practically collapsed, most prominently in Southeast Alaska, where the halting of the cruise industry – the forefront of the region's economy, along with mining – was expected to drain a projected $190 million and $800 million that would have been spent by cruise passengers and tourists, respectively. Southeast Alaska, home to the major cities of Juneau, Ketchikan, and Sitka, has historically been a Democratic stronghold, with Biden winning three of the region's four State House districts. 53% of the state believed Joe Biden would better handle the pandemic, and among the 17% of voters that viewed the pandemic as their most important issue, 81% voted for Biden.

The election corresponded with the 2020 United States Senate election in Alaska, with incumbent Republican Dan Sullivan being successfully re-elected against independent Al Gross, who was also nominated and endorsed by the Democratic Party. Sullivan won by a 12.71% margin, outperforming Trump by 2.65 percentage points, consistent with a nationwide trend where down-ballot Republicans outperformed Trump. In the United States House of Representatives election in Alaska, incumbent Republican Don Young underperformed Trump by 0.92 percentage points against Democrat-endorsed independent Alyse Galvin.

Exit polls

Associated Press 
The following are estimates from exit polls conducted by the University of Chicago for the Associated Press interviewing 689 likely voters in Alaska, adjusted to match the actual vote count.

See also
 United States presidential elections in Alaska
 2020 United States presidential election
 2020 Democratic Party presidential primaries
 2020 Libertarian Party presidential primaries
 2020 Republican Party presidential primaries
 2020 United States elections

Notes

Partisan clients

References

Further reading

External links
 
 
  (state affiliate of the U.S. League of Women Voters)
 

Alaska
2020
Presidential